Turrilatirus is a genus of sea snails, marine gastropod mollusks in the subfamily Fasciolariinae of the family Fasciolariidae, the spindle snails, the tulip snails and their allies.

Species
Species within the genus Turrilatirus include:

 Turrilatirus craticulatus (Linnaeus, 1758)
 Turrilatirus iris (Lightfoot, 1786)
 Turrilatirus lautus (Reeve, 1847)
 Turrilatirus melvilli (Schepman, 1911)
 Turrilatirus nagasakiensis (E.A. Smith, 1880)
 † Turrilatirus patruelis (Bellardi, 1884) 
 Turrilatirus sanguifluus (Reeve, 1847)
 Turrilatirus turritus (Gmelin, 1791)

References

External links
 Vermeij, G. J. & Snyder, M. A. (2006). Shell characters and taxonomy of Latirus and related fasciolariid groups. Journal of Molluscan Studies. 72(4): 413-424
 Couto D., Bouchet P., Kantor Yu.I., Simone L.R.L. & Giribet G. (2016). A multilocus molecular phylogeny of Fasciolariidae (Neogastropoda: Buccinoidea). Molecular Phylogenetics and Evolution. 99: 309-322

Fasciolariidae